Tomlinson v Gill (1756) Ambler 330 is an English contract law case concerning privity of contract. It stands as an example of the flexible approach to privity under the earlier common law.

Facts

Judgment
Lord Hardwicke decided that a third person is entitled to sue if there can be spelt out of the contract an intention by one of the parties to contract as trustee for him, even though nothing was said about any trust in the contract, and there was no trust fund to be administered.

See also

English contract law

Notes

References

English contract case law
1756 in British law
Court of Chancery cases